Jill Johnston (May 17, 1929 – September 18, 2010) was a British-born American feminist author and cultural critic who wrote Lesbian Nation in 1973 and was a longtime writer for The Village Voice. She was also a leader of the lesbian separatist movement of the 1970s. Johnston also wrote under the pen name F. J. Crowe.

Biography

Johnston was born as Jill Crowe in London in 1929, the only child of Olive Marjorie Crowe (born 1901), an American nurse, and Cyril F. Johnston (1884–1950), an English bellfounder and clockmaker whose family firm, Gillett & Johnston, created the carillon of Riverside Church in New York City. Her parents, who never married, separated when their daughter was an infant, and Johnston's mother took her to Little Neck, Queens, New York, where she was raised.

After attending college in Massachusetts and Minnesota, Johnston received a Master of Fine Arts degree from the University of North Carolina at Greensboro.

Career
For many years, beginning in 1959 and during the 1960s, Johnston was the dance critic for The Village Voice, the weekly downtown newspaper for New York City. She was friendly with many performers, performance artists, composers, poets and artists in New York City especially during the 1960s and 1970s. During the late 1960s Deborah Jowitt joined the paper and wrote a regular dance column for the Voice, while Johnston's dance column became a kind of weekly diary, chronicling her adventures in the New York art world.

Johnston was a member of a 1971 New York City panel produced by Shirley Broughton as part of the "Theater for Ideas" series. The event was a vigorous debate on feminism with Norman Mailer, author; Germaine Greer, author; Diana Trilling, literary critic; Jacqueline Ceballos, National Organization for Women president, and Johnston herself. The event was also billed as an intellectual "Battle of the Sexes" – effectively promoting Mailer's then-just-published,  feminism-critical book The Prisoner of Sex (1971).  When the time came for her to make her introductory remarks, Johnston read a poem, after which two feminist friends came onstage and the three simulated (fully dressed) three-way lesbian sex  (indulging in a bit of feminist Guerilla theatre, which she admitted she had learned from the Yippies) and quickly exited. Despite this colorful interruption, Greer and Mailer continued to exchange verbal blows with each other (and the audience) for the remainder of the 3½ hour event. This event was widely written about (since so many writers were in attendance, including Susan Sontag and Cynthia Ozick) and filmed by the now-legendary documentary filmmaker D. A. Pennebaker, eventually becoming the cult-documentary titled Town Bloody Hall.

As this incident illustrates, Johnston's self-described "east west flower child beat hip psychedelic paradise now love peace do your own thing approach to the revolution" (as she called it in Lesbian Nation) often confounded her feminist allies as much as it did the conservative foes of gay and lesbian liberation. In 1973, she predicted "an end to the catastrophic brotherhood and a return to the former glory and wise equanimity of the matriarchies."

As recorded in Lesbian Nation, Johnston often was at the center of controversies within the feminist movement of the 1960s and 1970s. She famously went on record stating that "all women are lesbians except those that don't know it yet."

Johnston was also one of the first countercultural and lesbian writers at Ms. magazine, eventually coming to the conclusion that the magazine was too mainstream, ultimately presenting feminism as palatable, family-friendly and safe. According to author Vivian Gornick:

For radical feminists like me, Ellen Willis, and Jill Johnston, we had a different kind of magazine in mind. We came out against marriage and motherhood. Gloria Steinem was uptown; we were downtown. She hung out with Establishment figures; we had only ourselves. It very quickly became obvious at that first meeting that they wanted a glossy that would appeal to the women who read the Ladies' Home Journal. We didn't want that, so they walked away with it.

On another occasion, Johnston grew bored at a poolside press conference given by feminist Betty Friedan, and so decided to strip off her top and take a swim.

In 1977, Johnson became an associate of the Women's Institute for Freedom of the Press (WIFP). WIFP is an American nonprofit publishing organization. The organization works to increase communication between women and connect the public with forms of women-based media.

Johnston's career as a dance critic was hampered by the controversy that attended the publication of Lesbian Nation and the publicity engendered by her dramatic style of lesbian feminist activism. She remained with The Village Voice until 1981 and subsequently wrote freelance art and literary criticism. Along with the political memoirs, Lesbian Nation and Gullible's Travels, Johnston published an anthology of dance criticism entitled Marmalade Me as well as the autobiographies Mother Bound and Paper Daughter.

Described by one critic as "part Gertrude Stein, part E. E. Cummings, with a dash of Jack Kerouac thrown for good measure," Johnston's freeform, fluid writing style of the 1970s matched the colorful nature of the tales recounted in her books Lesbian Nation and Gullibles Travels. Her later work as a literary and art critic for Art in America and the New York Times Review of Books is more standard in tone and content. Early writing not collected in other volumes can be found in Admission Accomplished while the critical biography Jasper Johns represents an example of her later style.

Johnston is the subject of one of Andy Warhol's portrait films, Jill, a 4½-minute silent movie shot in black and white (1963).

Personal life
In 1958 Johnston married Richard John Lanham, whom she divorced in 1964. They had two children, a son, Richard Renault Lanham, and a daughter, Winifred Brooke Lanham.

In 1993, in Denmark, she married Ingrid Nyeboe. The couple married again, in Connecticut, in 2009.

Death
On September 10, 2010, Johnston suffered a stroke in Hartford, Connecticut. She died eight days later, on September 18, 2010, at the age of 81.

Bibliography
 Marmalade Me (1971; revised 1998) – an anthology of short pieces on dance reprinted from Village Voice
 Lesbian Nation: The Feminist Solution (1973)
 Gullibles Travels (1974)
 Mother Bound (1983) – autobiographical
 Paper Daughter (1985) – autobiographical
 Secret Lives in Art (1994) – selected essays on literature, visual and performing arts
 Jasper Johns (1996) – critical biography of the artist
 Admission Accomplished: the Lesbian Nation years (1970–75) (1998) – anthology of earlier writing
 At Sea On Land: Extreme Politics (2005) – travel writings, with political commentary on government policies since 9/11
 England's Child: The Carillon and the Casting of Big Bells (2008) – a biography of Johnston's father, Cyril F. Johnston, a prominent English bellfounder and builder of carillons in the first half of the 20th century

Notes

References

External links

 Official website
 
 Born On This Day, 1929: Jill Johnston
 Town Bloody Hall (1979) on IMDb
 Lesbian Nation, R.I.P. by Alison Bechdel, 20 September 2010

1929 births
2010 deaths
20th-century American writers
21st-century American non-fiction writers
20th-century American women writers
21st-century American women writers
American art critics
American political writers
American women historians
American women journalists
Cultural historians
American lesbian writers
Lesbian feminists
Lesbian separatists
Radical feminists
American women critics
Yippies
The Village Voice people
English emigrants to the United States
People from Douglaston–Little Neck, Queens
Historians from New York (state)